Giannis Ragousis (born 11 December 1965) is a Greek economist and politician of SYRIZA who had previously served in the government of Panhellenic Socialist Movement.

Education
Giannis Ragousis graduated from the Department of Financial Studies of the Aristotle University of Thessaloniki with a major in Economics. He completed his studies with a master's degree in Financial Development from the University of Sussex, U.K.. 
Giannis Ragousis is fluent in English.

Politics
Giannis Ragousis, was a member of the Rectors Council, as well as the F.E.A.P.TH. from 1986, until 1989. From 1991 to 1993 he was the Secretary of PA.S.P., the youth division of the Panhellenic Socialist Movement (PASOK), as well as a member of the Central Council of the National Students Union of Greece (E.F.E.E.).

Giannis Ragousis was a member of the Central Committee of PASOK from 1994 until 1996.
In 2003, he was elected Mayor of Paros, a post he held until 2007.

He was first elected to the Hellenic Parliament on 16 September 2007, having been appointed party spokesman on 15 August.
 
After the 2009 election, George Papandreou made Ragousis his Minister for the Interior, Decentralization and e-Governance. He kept the post until a cabinet reshuffle on 17 June 2011, when he was appointed Minister for Infrastructure, Transport and Networks. On 11 November 2011, he became the Alternate Minister for National Defence in the national unity government of Lucas Papademos. He challenged Fofi Gennimata as leader of Movement for Change after the dissolution of Panhellenic Socialist Movement, before becoming a candidate of SYRIZA for the 2019 Greek legislative election.

Personal life
Giannis Ragousis is married to Katerina Roussou. They have a son, Nicolas and two daughters, Irene and Vassiliki.

Sources
 Biography, Hellenic Parliament website 
 Giannis Ragousis in the Economist Conference
 Giannis Ragousis in the International Conference on e-government
 Giannis Ragousis in TedXAthens

References

External links 
 Page on Giannis Ragousis on the Official Website of the Panhellenic Socialist Movement 
 Members of the Greek Parliament  - 
 Official Page of Giannis Ragousis on Facebook

1965 births
Living people
Greek MPs 2007–2009
Greek MPs 2009–2012
PASOK politicians
Syriza politicians
People from Paros
Ministers of the Interior of Greece
Aristotle University of Thessaloniki alumni
Alumni of the University of Sussex
Greek MPs 2019–2023